Chaste refers to practicing chastity.

Chaste may also refer to:

 Aymar Chaste (1514–1603), Catholic French admiral
 Chaste (Marvel Comics), a fictional Marvel Comics martial arts enclave
 Chaste (canton) - see List of townships in Quebec, Canada

See also
 List of people known as the Chaste